Scytodes univittata is a species of spitting spider in the family Scytodidae. It is found in Egypt, Iran, India, Turkmenia, Kirghizia, has been introduced into Hawaii, Mexico, Cuba, Venezuela, Brazil, Paraguay, Chile, Canary Islands, and Spain.

Subspecies
These two subspecies belong to the species Scytodes univittata:
 (Scytodes univittata univittata) Simon, 1882
 Scytodes univittata unilineata Thorell, 1887

References

Scytodidae
Articles created by Qbugbot
Spiders described in 1882